CheapAir.com is an American online travel agency, established in 1989 by Jeff Klee. Based in Calabasas, California, with additional offices in Chicago and Denver, CheapAir.com is a privately owned company. According to Travel Weekly, CheapAir.com, under the parent company Amtrav, is ranked #48 on the 2013 Power List of Travel Agencies in the United States.

History
Founded in 1989 by CEO, Jeff Klee, out of his University of Michigan dorm room, CheapAir.com was originally known as 1-800-Cheap-Air prior to the website launch in 2000. In 1993 Craig Fichtelberg became a co-founder and president and began the nationwide expansion from California to Chicago to NYC.

In 2011, CheapAir.com announced  Price Drop Payback, a program that guarantees to reimburse any price difference before a flight.

In 2012, after airlines began adding ancillary revenue, CheapAir.com added amenities like WiFi, movies, Live TV, and power ports, to its online shopping display.

In September 2012, CheapAir.com launched “Easy Search”, which lets users enter natural language to search for travel deals, becoming one of the first travel websites to offer semantic search.

In March 2013, CheapAir.com created the first voice-activated flight search app for iOS devices. The app won a Travel Weekly award and was named one of the best apps and websites for travelers.

In November 2013, CheapAir.com became the first travel agency worldwide to accept bitcoin as an alternate form of payment for flights. In February 2014, CheapAir became the first travel agency worldwide to accept bitcoin as an alternate form of payment for hotels.

In February 2015, CheapAir.com became the first U.S. travel agency to book direct flights from the U.S. to Cuba.

References

External links
 

American travel websites
American companies established in 1989
Transport companies established in 1989
Internet properties established in 2000
Online travel agencies
Travel ticket search engines
Companies based in Calabasas, California
1989 establishments in Michigan